The "argumentative turn" refers to a group of different approaches in policy analysis and planning that emphasize the increased relevance of argumentation, language and deliberation in policy making. Inspired by the "linguistic turn" in the field of humanities, it was developed as an alternative to the epistemological limitations of "neo-positivist" policy analysis and its underlying technocratic understanding of the decision-making process. The argumentative approach systematically integrates empirical and normative questions into a methodological framework oriented towards the analysis of policy deliberation. It is sensitive to the situative context and the multiple kinds of knowledge practices involved in each stage of the policy process, drawing attention to different forms of argumentation, persuasion and justification.

Overview 
The term "argumentative turn" was introduced by Frank Fischer and John F. Forester in the introduction to their edited volume "The argumentative turn in policy analysis and planning", published in 1993, assembling a group of different approaches towards policy analysis that share an emphasis on the importance of language, meaning, rhetoric and values as key features in the analysis of policy-making and planning. As a shift away from the positivistic and technocratic implications of the dominant empirical approach to problem-solving, the argumentative turn tries to offer an alternative perspective towards policy inquiry. Instead of focusing exclusively on empiricist law-like logical inference and causal explanation, the post-empiricist approach highlights numerous forms of social research practices, thereby not disqualifying the search for empirically valid data, but embedding scientific expertise into a meaningful social context. The argumentative approach therefore rejects the assumption that policy analysis can be a value-free, technical project, since it always involves complex combinations of descriptive and normative elements. As a commitment to deliberative and participatory conceptions of democracy, the argumentative perspective also rejects a top-down understanding of governance, testifying to the dynamic exchange between public and private interests and the important role of experts in the complex processes of policy-making. The policy-analyst is no longer concerned with the improvement of political performance, but tries to stimulate the political process of policy deliberation, thereby promoting communicative competences and social learning.

Emergence of the argumentative approach 
The argumentative approach towards policy analysis grew out of a disappointment with the prevailing intellectual setting, since the 60s largely dominated by the "rational project" of neo-positivist political science, and its tendency to mask political and bureaucratic interests behind an ideology of science as a value free project. In 1989, Giandomenico Majone published 'Evidence, Argument, and Persuasion in Policy Analysis' that together with Deborah Stone's "Policy Paradox" (1988) and John S. Dryzek's "Discursive Democracy" (1990) became key texts in the formative process of the new argumentative perspective on policy analysis. But it was not until Frank Fischer and John F. Forester proclaimed "The Argumentative Turn in Policy Analysis and Planning" (1993) that argumentative policy analysis became a distinctive approach with a well defined research agenda, which moved language, argumentation and rhetoric to the center of attention. Although other approaches to policy analysis also highlighted the important role of ideas, they tended to conceptualize language only as one variable next to others, thereby neglecting its constitutive role in the construction of social reality. The argumentative approach on the other hand puts a more sophisticated emphasis and a deeper understanding to important aspects of language and discourse in the policy process. Ideas and discourse are not only means for actors trying to achieve particular ends, but they have a force of their own, especially in combination with relations of power, since they both carry knowledge and frame social reality.

Theoretical tradition 
Building on Harold Lasswell, founder of  the "policy science orientation", the argumentative perspective combines a multidisciplinary approach to policy analysis with an explicitly normative orientation towards democratic values. Therefore, it integrates multiple theoretical perspectives that altogether highlight the importance of language and meaning in the context of social inquiry: British ordinary language analysis, French post-structuralism, Frankfurt school of critical social theory and American pragmatism. On the one hand, the importance of the work of Jürgen Habermas on communicative action and his critique of technocracy and scientism, together with Michel Foucault's writings on discourse and power cannot be overestimated in their contribution of major theoretical elements to the development of the argumentative approach. The contextual orientation towards the situated nature of argumentative praxis, on the other hand, was heavily influenced 1) by the tradition of "ordinary language philosophy", especially the later work of Ludwig Wittgenstein and John L. Austin's speech act theory, and 2) by scholars of pragmatism, like George Herbert Mead, John Dewey, Charles S. Peirce and Richard Rorty. Nonetheless, due to the multiple and dispersed perspectives on language and meaning the argumentative approach tries to articulate, there exist great variations concerning the basic theoretical assumptions (hermeneutics, structuralism/post-structuralism, pragmatism).

Knowledge and deliberative practice 
Instead of offering a comprehensive theory of knowledge, the argumentative approach tries to focus on a better description of what social scientist already do. Science is understood as a socio-cultural practice mediated by symbolic systems of meaning, located in historically specific places and communities. Therefore, the argumentative approach rejects neo-positivistic versions of correspondence theory, rather building scientific investigation on a coherence theory of truth, thereby giving voice to the importance of inter-subjective practices of argumentation and deliberation. Every empirical proposition is haunted by factors of indeterminacy, while empirical data only makes sense located in a meaningful context. The argumentative approach therefore tries to develop a richer perspective on political controversies, which cannot be understood to be about raw data, but rather about the conflicting assumptions that organize them. Logical deduction and empirical falsification cannot make sense of a world that is much more complex and in flux, than necessary for the maintenance of the neo-positivist perspective. Therefore, the post-empiricist framework involves a multimethodological approach, that substitutes the formal logic of neo-positivism, with something that Aristotle called phronesis - an informal deliberative framework of practical reason. This conception of reason proofs to be a more accurate response to the forms of rationality exhibited in real-world policy analysis and implementation.

Assembling different approaches 
The argumentative turn links different approaches in the field of policy science that altogether put a strong emphasis on the important role of language and meaning:
 Argumentative policy analysis (Fischer 2003a, Gottweis 2006)
 Participatory policy analysis (Fischer 1990, 2007)
 Interpretative policy analysis (Yanow 1996, 2006)
 Policy frame analysis (Schön and Rein 1994, Yanow 2006, Waagenar 2011)
 Critical policy discourse analysis (Gottweis 1998, Hajer 1995, Wagenaar 2011, Yanow 2006)
 Post-structuralist Policy Analysis (Gottweis 1998)
 Narrative policy analysis (Roe 1994)
 Rhetorical policy analysis (Gottweis 2006)
 Communicative policy analysis (Fischer 2007)
 Dramaturgical policy analysis (Hajer and Veersteg 2005)
 Deliberative policy analysis (Hajer and Wagenaar 2003)
 Discourse coalition theory (Hajer 2005)

Critique and reaction 
The main critique often pointed against discursive approaches and their focus on narratives, language and deliberation, is that they imply 1) a version of idealism and 2) forms of scientific, moral and political relativism.

Against the first point, the argumentative approach does not deny the existence of a world out there, but rather points to the cognitive limits of scientific inquiry. Whatever the inner nature of the world out there might be, we have no immediate access to it. Our perspective on the world is always mediated by socio-cultural systems of meaning and the cognitive frames that are expressions of our situated knowledge. Discourse operate as conditions of possibility of experience, since they provide reality with meaning and draw a line between the visible and the invisible.

The second point is directed against the contextualism of the argumentative approach, saying that there is no point from which to distinguish the true from the false or the good from the bad, so every perspective is equal to another. But this view from nowhere, where everything has the status of being valid in same way, does not exist for the post-positivist researcher. The perspective of the policy-analyst is always already organized according to a shared horizon of meaning, where she can put herself into the positions of reflective distance, but cannot transcend it. Political actors, social scientists and people doing their everyday business always use specific systems of evaluation and judgment, which are actualized or transformed in the context of their inter-subjective deliberative practices. On the one hand, building on Foucault, discourse has to be connected to the analysis of relations of power, although communicative practises cannot be reduced to mere manifestations of dominance or ideology. On the other hand, sticking to Habermas, the approach makes an explicit normative commitment towards conceptions of deliberative democracy, thereby facilitating dialogical exchange and debate between actors with different interests and perspectives.

Notes

References 
Dryzek, John S. 1990: Discursive Democracy: Politics, Policy and Political Science, Cambridge: Cambridge University Press. .
Fischer, Frank 1990: Technocracy and the Politics of Expertise. Newbury Park: Sage. .
Fischer, Frank 2003a: Reframing Public Policy. Discursive Politics and Deliberative Practices. New York: Oxford University Press. .
Fischer, Frank 2003b: Beyond empiricism: policy analysis as deliberative practice. in: Hajer, Maarten and Hendrik Wagenaar 2003 [eds.]: Deliberative Policy Analysis. Understanding Governance in the Network Society. Cambridge: Cambridge University Press. .
Fischer, Frank 2007: Deliberative Policy Analysis as Practical Reason: Integrating Empirical and Normative Arguments. in: Fischer, Frank/Gerald J. Miller/Mara S. Sidney [eds.] 2007: Handbook of Public Policy Analysis. Theory, Politics and Methods. Boca Raton: CRC Press. .
Fischer, Frank and John Forester [eds.] 1993: The Argumentative Turn in Policy Analysis and Planning. Durham & London: Duke University Press. .
Fischer, Frank and Herbert Gottweis [eds.] 2012: The Argumentative Turn Revisited. Public Policy as Communicative Practice. Durham & London: Duke University Press. .
Gottweis, Herbert 2006: Argumentative Policy Analysis. in: Peters, B. Guy and Jon Pierre 2006: Handbook of Public Policy. London/New Delhi: Sage. .
Gottweis, Herbert 1998: Governing Molecules: The Discursive Politics of Genetic Engineering  in Europe and in the United States. Cambridge: MIT Press. .
Hajer, Maarten 1995: The Politics of Environmental Discourse: Ecological Modernization and the Policy Process. Oxford: Oxford University Press. .
Hajer, Maarten 2005: Coalitions, Practices, and Meaning in Environmental Politics: From Acid Rain to BSE, in: David R. R. Howarth und Jacob Torfing [eds.]: Discourse Theory in European Politics. Basingstoke: Palgrave Macmillan, 297-315. 
Hajer, Maarten and Wytske Veersteg 2005: Performing Governance Through Networks, in: European Political Science 4, 340-347.
Hajer, Maarten and Hendrik Wagenaar 2003 [eds.]: Deliberative Policy Analysis. Understanding Governance in the Network Society. Cambridge: Cambridge University Press. .
Hall, Peter 1993: Policy Paradigms, Social Learning, and the State. The Case of Economic Policymaking in Britain, in: Comparative Politics 25 (3), 275-296.
Majone, Giandomenico 1989: Evidence, Argument and Persuasion in the Policy Process. New Haven: Yale University Press. .
Marsh, David and Paul Furlong 2002: A Skin not a Sweater: Ontology and Epistemology in Political Science, in: David Marsh and Gerry Stoker [eds.]: Theory and Methods in Political Science. Houndmills: Palgrave Macmillan, 17-41. .
Roe, Emery 1994: Narrative Policy Analysis: Theory and Practice, Durham, NC: Duke University Press. .
Stone, Deborah 1988: Policy Paradox and Political Reason. Boston: Little, Brown. .
Schön, Donald Alan and Martin Rein 1994: Frame Reflection: Toward the Resolution of Intractable Policy Controversies. New York: Basic Books. .
Wagenaar, Hendrik 2011: Meaning in Action. Interpretation and Dialogue in Policy Analysis. London: ME. Sharp. .
Yanow, Dvora 1996: How Does a Policy Mean? Interpreting Policy and Organizational Actions. Washington: Georgetown University Press. .
Yanow, Dvora 2006: Conducting Interpretive Policy Analysis. Newbury Park: Sage. .

Policy debate